Michael O'Shea (born September 21, 1970) is the head coach of the Winnipeg Blue Bombers of the Canadian Football League (CFL). He is a former Canadian football linebacker and former special teams coordinator of the Toronto Argonauts of the CFL from 2010 to 2013, winning the Grey Cup in 2012. O'Shea played 16 seasons in the CFL for the Hamilton Tiger-Cats and Toronto Argonauts from 1993 to 2008. He retired second all-time in career tackles with 1,154 and is one of only three players to record over 1,000 tackles. He won the CFL's Most Outstanding Canadian Award in 1999 after recording 84 tackles, 13 special teams tackles and three interceptions that year. O'Shea is a three-time Grey Cup champion as a player, having won all three with the Argonauts in 1996, 1997, and 2004. He is also a two-time Grey Cup winning head coach, having won with the Winnipeg Blue Bombers in 2019 and 2021; O'Shea also won the Grey Cup previously as a special teams coach with the Toronto Argonauts in the 100th Grey Cup.

Professional career

Hamilton Tiger-Cats 
The Edmonton Eskimos picked O'Shea in the 1st round (4th overall) in the 1993 CFL Canadian College Draft.  However, he was soon after traded to Hamilton by Edmonton along with QB DeChane Cameron, linebacker DeWayne Odom and a negotiation list player in exchange for QB Damon Allen on February 16, 1993.

In his first season in the CFL in 1993, O'Shea started in all 18 games.  In 1994, he once again played in all 18 games during the regular season.  He had 95 DT, 11 special teams tackles and 5 interceptions during the regular season.  He was also named to the East Division All-Star team at middle linebacker.  In 1995, O'Shea played in 10 games for Hamilton, made 69 DT, 4 special teams tackles and intercepted 2 passes during the regular season.  He was named to the North Division All-Star team. In Hamilton’s 31-13 loss to the Calgary Stampeders in the North Division Semi-Final, made 4 DT and 1 special teams tackle.

Toronto Argonauts 
O'Shea signed with the Argonauts half way through the 1996 season after he was one of the final cuts in the Detroit Lions training camp.  He played in the last 8 games of the regular season started Toronto’s final 5 games of the regular season.  He helped lead Toronto to the 1996 Grey Cup game in a win over Edmonton.  He would also help Toronto win its second Grey Cup in as many years in the 1997 game.  O'Shea would also play in Toronto in the 1998 and 1999 season as middle linebacker, putting up good numbers.

Hamilton Tiger-Cats 
Hamilton acquired O'Shea in a trade with Toronto in exchange for RB Éric Lapointe, the right of first refusal on all offensive lineman and the playing rights to Orlondo Steinauer on June 11, 2000.  He made an immediate impact in the season opener vs. B.C. as he contributed with 7 DT, made 3 DT On October 13, 2000 in the Tiger-Cats’ 32-8 loss to Toronto, O'Shea had his best individual game of the season with 12 DT and 1 pass knockdown.  He finished the season third in the league with 90 DT.

Toronto Argonauts 
O'Shea signed with the Argonauts once again as a free agent in the 2001 season.  The Argonauts had a horrible 2001 season.  In 2002, the Argos seemed to turn it around, and made it to the East final only to lose to Montreal. In his second tenure with the Argonauts, O'Shea was an important component of the Argonauts' strong defence. In 2004, O'Shea helped lead the Argos to the 2004 Grey Cup Championship, beating the B.C. Lions 27-19, winning his 3rd Grey Cup, all with the Argonauts.

Against the Saskatchewan Roughriders on October 20, 2006, he became the first Canadian and third player in CFL history to record 1000 career tackles. In 2007, he was voted as the middle linebacker on the All-Time Argos Team. O'Shea was released by the Argonauts on February 27, 2009. He finished his career with the second most games played by an Argonaut with 205, 17 games behind former linebacker Don Moen.

Based on his playing career, he was inducted into the Canadian Football Hall of Fame in 2017.

Coaching career 
O'Shea was hired by the Toronto Argonauts as their special teams coordinator for the 2010 season. He spent three seasons in Toronto where he won his first Grey Cup as a coach in the 100th Grey Cup. 

The Winnipeg Blue Bombers hired O'Shea on December 4, 2013, he became the team's 30th Head Coach in team history. In his sixth year with the team, O'Shea won his first Grey Cup as a head coach, defeating the Hamilton Tiger-Cats and ending a 29-year drought in Winnipeg with a win in the 107th Grey Cup game. O'Shea had helped establish a winning foundation for the Bombers, following four successful double-digit win seasons. As a result of this, the Blue Bombers extended him for an additional three seasons through to 2022.  O'Shea would help guide the Bombers to two more Grey Cup appearances, winning in 2021 and losing to the Argonauts to close out the 2022 season. He was named coach of the year in both seasons. Following three consecutive trips to the championship match O'Shea and the Blue Bombers agreed on a three-year contract extension in December 2022.

CFL coaching record

Personal life 
O'Shea and his wife have three children; one son and two daughters. In August 2022 the City of North Bay, Ontario named a football field at the Steve Omischl Sports Complex after him.

References

External links 
 Winnipeg Blue Bombers profile
 

1970 births
Living people
Canadian Football League Most Outstanding Canadian Award winners
Canadian Football League Rookie of the Year Award winners
Canadian football linebackers
Canadian people of Irish descent
Guelph Gryphons football players
Hamilton Tiger-Cats players
Sportspeople from North Bay, Ontario
Players of Canadian football from Ontario
Toronto Argonauts coaches
Toronto Argonauts players
Winnipeg Blue Bombers coaches
Canadian Football Hall of Fame inductees